The National Unionist Party was a political party based in the Punjab Province during the period of British rule in India. The Unionist Party mainly represented the interests of the landed gentry and landlords of Punjab, which included Muslims, Hindus and Sikhs. The Unionists dominated the political scene in Punjab from World War I to the independence of India and Pakistan (and the partition of the province) in 1947. The party's leaders served as Prime Minister of the Punjab.

The creed of the Unionist Party emphasized: "Dominion Status and a United Democratic federal constitution for India as a whole".

Organisation
The Unionist Party, a secular party, was formed to represent the interests of Punjab's large feudal classes and gentry. Sir Sikandar Hayat Khan, Sir Fazli Husain, Sir Shahab-ud-Din, Muhammad Hussain Shah and Sir Chhotu Ram were all members of the party. Although a majority of Unionists were Muslims, a large number of Hindus and Sikhs also supported and participated in the Unionist Party.

In contrast with the Indian National Congress and many other parties of the time, the Unionist Party did not have a mass-based approach. Also, in contrast with the Indian National Congress and the Muslim League, the Unionists supported the British Raj, and contested elections for the Punjab Legislative Council and the central Legislative Council at a time when the Congress and the Muslim League were boycotting them. As a result, the Unionist Party dominated the provincial legislature for a number of years, allowing an elected provincial government to function when other provinces were governed by direct rule.

Punjab government

In the 1937 Indian provincial elections, the Unionist Party soundly defeated the Muslim League in the Punjab. The Unionist Party won 98 seats (out of 175 total), including 78 of the 89 Muslim seats, while the Muslim League won only two. The Muslim elements of the Unionists shared many common points with the Muslim League and followed a rather similar policy and agenda for national interests and issues; but the Unionists were virtually an independent political party in the 1920s and 1930s, when the Muslim League was unpopular and divided into feuding factions. The links improved after Muhammad Ali Jinnah became the League's president in the mid-1930s and by October 1937, and then he was able to convince Sir Sikandar Hayat Khan to come to terms with him via the famous Sikandar-Jinnah Pact. However, the rule of Unionist leader Sir Sikandar remained undisputed in the Punjab and he remained the Punjab's Premier (Chief Minister) from 1937 to 1942, in alliance with the Indian National Congress and the Shiromani Akali Dal despite Jinnah's opposition to both parties. Sir Sikandar thus remained the most popular and influential politician in Punjab during his lifetime, preventing both Jinnah and Sir Muhammad Iqbal from gaining the support of a majority of Punjabi Muslims. In the 1946 elections, however, Muslim League won 73 of the 89 Muslim seats in Punjab, while the Unionist Party under Khizar Hayat Tiwana won 13. Overall, the Muslim League failed to win any non-Muslim seat and fell short of the half-way mark of 88 required to form the government, while the Unionist Party won 19 seats in total and formed a short-lived coalition governmentwith INC (which had won 51 seats) and the Shiromani Akali Dal (which had won 21).

Decline
After the death of Khan in 1942, the party gradually collapsed. Jinnah and his pro-separatist Muslim League demanded of the new leader, Khizar Hayat Khan Tiwana, that the word "Muslim" be incorporated into the party name. Tiwana, however, refused to alienate his Hindu and Sikh supporters, and was opposed to the partition of India. As a result, the pro-separatist Muslim League sought to intimidate Tiwana.

The Muslim League's Direct Action Day campaign brought the downfall of Sir Khizar's ministry, which depended on Congress and Akali support; inter-community relations were effectively destroyed as communal violence against Hindus, across India claimed the lives of tens of thousands of people. With the partition of India in August 1947 into the two independent dominions of India and Pakistan, Punjab was itself partitioned between the two new countries, with the Muslim majority West Punjab forming part of Pakistan, and the Hindu-Sikh majority East Punjab forming part of independent India. The Unionist Party's diverse pan-provincial organisation was destroyed, with some Muslim Unionists integrating themselves into the Muslim League; the party ceased to exist in independent India and Pakistan.

Legacy
In Sindh Province, a Sind United Party modelled on the lines of the Punjab Unionists and representing similar interests. It became the largest party in the province at the 1937 provincial election.

In 2013, guar farmers in Rajasthan formed the National Unionist Zamindara Party (or Zamindara Party) to represent their interests. While there is no connection to the historic Punjab Unionists, the new party honours the legacy of Unionist leaders like Sir Chhotu Ram. The party was successful in winning 2 seats in the 2013 state election.

See also
 Allama Mashriqi
 Khaksar Tehrik
 Majlis-e-Ahrar-ul-Islam
 Syed Ata Ullah Shah Bukhari

References

Further reading

External links

Indian independence movement
Pakistan Movement
Defunct political parties in Punjab, India
Defunct political parties in Pakistan
Muslim League
Conservative parties in India